The 1902 Notre Dame football team was an American football team that represented the University of Notre Dame in the 1902 college football season. In its first season with James Farragher as coach, the team compiled a  record and outscored all opponents by a combined total   Against Indiana, Notre Dame became the first team to defeat the Hoosiers on Jordan Field, a 17-game stretch that started with the field's renaming in 1898. Indiana's full home win streak extended to 23 games.

Schedule

References

Notre Dame
Notre Dame Fighting Irish football seasons
Notre Dame football